William Longair (19 July 1870 – 28 November 1926) was a Scottish footballer who played as a half-back for Dundee in the 1890s. When he retired from playing, he became the club's trainer for over two decades, and remained an influential figure at the club.

Born in Dundee, Longair began his football career with Dundee F.C. in the early 1890s. He made his debut for Scotland in March 1894, and signed for Newton Heath in February 1895. He played for Newton Heath for four months, making one appearance, before returning to Dundee in June 1895. Short spells at Sunderland and Burnley followed in the 1896–97 season, before he moved to Brighton United in 1898 after a brief return up north. He returned to Dundee once again in May 1899, retiring from football in 1902.

Longair would later go on to become the club's trainer and perform the role for over 20 years, including training the eventual 1910 Scottish Cup winners. Longair would also become Dundee's groundsman in 1924. Upon his death in 1926, a crowd of approximately 20,000 lined the streets as his coffin passed to honour his services to the club and the city.

His uncle, also named William Longair, was Lord Provost of the Burgh of Dundee from 1905 to 1908.

On 3 April 2009, Longair was inducted into Dundee's Hall of Fame (Heritage Award).

References

External links
Scotland profile at LondonHearts.com
Man Utd profile at MUFCInfo.com
Portrait and info on career with Brighton United at Spartacus Educational

1870 births
1926 deaths
Footballers from Dundee
Scotland international footballers
Scottish footballers
Association football midfielders
Dundee F.C. players
Manchester United F.C. players
Sunderland A.F.C. players
Burnley F.C. players
Brighton United F.C. players

Dundee F.C. non-playing staff